Pas Band (also Romanized as Pasband) is a village in Kal Rural District, Eshkanan District, Lamerd County, Fars Province, Iran. At the 2006 census, its population was 620, in 151 families.

References 

Populated places in Lamerd County